A proposition is a statement expressing something that is either true or false.

Proposition may also refer to:

Politics
 Proposition (politics), political parties favorable to the incumbent government, as against the opposition
 Ballot proposition, a piece of proposed legislation to be approved or rejected by eligible voters
California ballot proposition, a referendum or initiative measure in California
Proposition (party), a political party in Ukraine

Art and entertainment
 The Proposition (painting), 1631 genre painting by Judith Leyster
 The Proposition (1998 film), 1998 film starring Kenneth Branagh
 The Proposition (2005 film), a 2005 film written by Nick Cave
The Proposition (soundtrack), the film's soundtrack recorded by Nick Cave
 Propositions (album), a 1982 album by The Bar-Kays
 "The Proposition", a 2008 episode of web series SPAMasterpiece Theater

Other uses
 Proposition bet, a bet made regarding the occurrence during a game of an event not directly affecting the outcome
 Value proposition, in business the promise of a value to be delivered
 Hypothesis, a proposed explanation for a phenomenon

See also
Proposal (disambiguation)
 Propositional calculus, branch of logic concerned with the study of propositions